"Taking Me Back" is a song by American rock musician Jack White. First released in October 2021, it was his first new solo music in over three years. The song served as the lead single from his 2022 album Fear of the Dawn, and its b-side, a mellower acoustic re-recording of the song entitled "Taking Me Back (Gently)", was also the first song released from his second album of 2022, Entering Heaven Alive.

Composition 
Musically, "Taking Me Back" has been described as hard rock and garage rock. The song features a relatively minimal arrangement in which White himself plays every instrument, such as guitar with heavy effects over it paired with drums and other percussion as well as various synthesizers, with the track overall being described by Stereogum as a "serrated riff-rocker with yelpy electric-shock vocals and some unhinged guitar action".

Release and promotion 
"Taking Me Back" was initially revealed on October 18, 2021 as part of the soundtrack and promotional campaign of the video game Call of Duty: Vanguard, and on that same day a lyric video featuring footage from the game was uploaded to White's YouTube channel along with a visualizer for "Taking Me Back (Gently)". The lyric video was also uploaded to the official Call of Duty YouTube channel two days later. On November 11, 2021, it was revealed that the songs were tied to two new upcoming studio albums, with the title and tracklists of both Fear of the Dawn and Entering Heaven Alive being revealed on White's website. Also on November 11, the official music video for "Taking Me Back" - directed by Jack White and Lauren Dunn - was premiered on White's YouTube Channel, gaining almost a million views within its first week on the site. On January 7, 2022, White uploaded a video of an in-studio live rehearsal of the track to YouTube to introduce the lineup of his backing band for the Supply Chain Issues Tour that he would begin on April 8 of that year in support of both Fear of the Dawn and Entering Heaven Alive.

The song was also used by TNT and TBS for their coverage of the 2022 Stanley Cup playoffs.

White performed the song as part of a medley with the title track of Fear of the Dawn on the February 25, 2023, episode of Saturday Night Live.

Reception 
"Taking Me Back" received generally positive reviews, and was White's first song as a solo artist to top a Billboard chart. In relation to his previous work, Variety characterized the "hard rocking" track as featuring "skronking guitar effects" reminiscent of White's previous album, 2018's Boarding House Reach, while Rolling Stone found White to be "[back] in his wheelhouse of percussive, blown-out rock & roll".

Track listing 
Digital release and 7-inch vinyl (Third Man TMR 748)

Personnel 

 Jack White – vocals, guitar, drums, bass, synthesizer, percussion, production, engineering, and mixing
 Joshua V. Smith – engineering and mixing
 Bill Skibbe – mixing and mastering

Charts

References 

Jack White songs
2021 songs
Third Man Records singles
Songs written by Jack White